The UCI Track Cycling World Championships – Women's keirin is the women's world championship keirin event held annually at the UCI Track Cycling World Championships. It was first held at the 2002 championships in Copenhagen, Denmark. ,  Anna Meares from Australia and Kristina Vogel from Germany share the most titles with three each.

Medalists

Medal table

See also
UCI Track Cycling World Championships – Women's sprint
UCI Track Cycling World Championships – Men's keirin

External links
Track Cycling World Championships 2016–1893 bikecult.com
World Championship, Track, Keirin, Elite cyclingarchives.com

 
Women's keirin
Lists of UCI Track Cycling World Championships medalists